Ular could refer to:

 Ular, Indonesia, an island in the Sunda Strait
 Ular, Russia, part of the Uvs Nuur Basin World Heritage Site
 an alternative transliteration of Volar, Afghanistan